Connie Field is a director of documentary features.

Her works include The Life and Times of Rosie the Riveter (1980), Forever Activists (1990), Freedom on My Mind (1994) and Have You Heard From Johannesburg (2010).

Her resume have been nominated for two Academy Awards, and other film awards, including a Primetime Emmy, the Sundance Grand Jury Prize and two International Documentary Association Best Feature and Series awards.

Early life
Field was born to a Jewish family in Washington, D.C. and was a full-time organizer for social causes in the late 1960s and 1970s in Boston and New York City.  She was a journalist for The Old Mole, a radical New Left oriented underground newspaper and a member of Boston Newsreel, one of a group of independent filmmaking and distribution organizations around the country, which made over 60 documentaries in conjunction with grass-roots organizers to serve as catalysts for social change. Upon moving to New York City, she worked for The People’s Coalition for Peace and Justice and the Indochina Peace Campaign, both national organizations working for a just end to the war in Vietnam. During this time, she discovered a history never taught her generation of the many struggles for social equality achieved by previous generations. Both the importance of this discovery and her commitment to social justice would shape the rest of her life and work.

Film career
Field's first film, The Life and Times of Rosie the Riveter, told the story of American women who went to work during World War II to do “men's jobs.” It has been selected by the United States National Film Registry of the Library of Congress for preservation as a significant component of America’s film heritage.

She was co-director of the documentary Forever Activists (1990), an Oscar-nominated film produced and directed by Judy Montell about the lifelong activism of seven members of the Abraham Lincoln Brigade, the American contingent who fought on the Loyalist side in the Spanish Civil War.

Freedom on My Mind (1994) premiered at the Sundance Film Festival and is a history of the Mississippi Voter Registration Project during the Civil Rights Movement which culminated in Freedom Summer in 1964. It was nominated for an Academy Award and won the Grand Jury Prize for Best Documentary at the Sundance Film Festival. Variety called it “a landmark documentary that chronicles the most tumultuous and significant years in the history of the civil rights movement. A must see” while The Chicago Tribune gave similar praise. It was also broadcast on PBS’s American Experience.

Have You Heard From Johannesburg (2010) is a seven-film series covering the struggle of the global anti-apartheid movement to end apartheid in South Africa. It has been called “a monumental chronicle not just of one nation and its hideous regime, but of the second half of the 20th century.” The series won a Primetime Emmy Award for its broadcast on PBS's Independent Lens in 2012, and was awarded Best Limited Series by the International Documentary Association, and named Best Documentary of 2010 by The Village Voice and Time Out New York.

Other work includes ¡Salud! (2007), a documentary on Cuba’s role in the struggle for global health equity and the complex realities confronting the movement to make healthcare everyone’s birthright.

Selected filmography
 The Whistleblower of My Lai (2018)
 Oliver Tambo: Have You Heard From Johannesburg (2018)
 Al Helm: Martin Luther King in Palestine (2013)
 Have You Heard From Johannesburg (2010)
 ¡Salud! (2007)
 Freedom on My Mind (1994)
 Forever Activists: Stories from the Veterans of the Abraham Lincoln Brigade (1990)
 The Life and Times of Rosie the Riveter (1980)

Awards and nominations
The Life and Times of Rosie the Riveter
 Best Documentary nomination, British Academy of Film and Television Arts, 1981
 winner, Gold Hugo, Chicago International Film Festival, 1980
 winner, Golden Marazzo, Festival dei Popoli, 1980
 winner, Gold Award, Houston International Film Festival, 1980
 winner, CINE Golden Eagle, 1981
 winner, Golden Athena, Athens Festival
 winner, Finalist Award, National Educational Film Festival, 1982
 winner, Blue Ribbon Award, American Film Festival, 1981
 winner, John Grierson Award, American Film Festival, Educational Film Library Association

Freedom on My Mind
 Best Documentary Feature nomination, The 67th Academy Awards, 1994
 winner, Documentary Feature Grand Jury Prize, Sundance Film Festival, 1994
 winner, Best of Northern California, National Educational Film Festival, 1994
 winner, Erik Barnouw Award, Organization of American Historians, 1995
 winner, John O’Connor Award, American Historical Association
 winner, Bronze Award, WorldFest Houston, 1994
 winner, Distinguished Documentary Award, International Documentary Association, 1994
 winner, National Educational Association Award for Excellence in the Advancement of Learning through Broadcasting, 1996
 winner, CINE Golden Eagle, 1996

¡Salud!
 winner, Audience Award, Pan African Film Festival, 2007
 winner, Henry Hampton Award for Excellence in Film & Media, Council on Foundations, 2008
 winner, Film Award, American Medical Students Association, 2007

Have You Heard From Johannesburg
 winner, Primetime Emmy Award for Exceptional Merit in Documentary Filmmaking, The Academy of Television Arts and Sciences, 2012
 winner, Best Limited Series, International Documentary Association, 2010
 winner, Gold Hugo for Best Documentary Series, Chicago International Film Festival Hugo Television Awards, 2012
 Best Documentary Feature nomination, BFI London Film Festival, 2009
 winner, Best Documentary Feature, Vancouver International Film Festival, 2006
 winner, Best Documentary Feature, Pan African Film Festival, 2007

Al Helm: Martin Luther King in Palestine
 winner, CrossCurrents Foundation Justice Matters Award, Washington DC International Film Festival, 2014
 winner, Audience Favorite – Active Cinema, Mill Valley Film Festival, 2013
 winner, CINE Golden Eagle, 2012

References

External links

Clarity Films
Clarity Docs

Living people
Artists from Washington, D.C.
Year of birth missing (living people)
American documentary filmmakers
Sundance Film Festival award winners
Jewish American artists
21st-century American Jews